The Motor Industry Staff Association (MISA) is a trade union representing workers in the motor industry in South Africa.

The union was founded on 22 September 1949 in Bloemfontein, to represent white collar workers.  For many years, it only admitted white workers.

By 1985, the union had affiliated to the Federation of South African Labour Unions, and by 1996 it had grown to 20,000 members.  In 1997, it was a founding affiliate of the Federation of Unions of South Africa,

In 2003, the union absorbed the Motor Industry Employees' Union, which represented technical workers in the industry.  By 2019, the union had grown to 50,000 members.

External links

References

Trade unions established in 1949
Trade unions in South Africa
Vehicle industry trade unions